The following article is a summary of the 2008 football season in Kenya, the 45th competitive season in its history.

Premier League
The Premier League was sponsored by South African television channel SuperSport, meaning that it was broadcast live on TV after several years and offered financial benefits. Francis Ouma, with 15 goals, finished as the top scorer.

16 teams took part and Mathare United won its first league title. The season concluded on November 22, 2008.

Relegation
Mahakama and Mathare Youth were relegated from the league and were replaced by Nationwide League champions A.F.C. Leopards and Sofapaka, who were top in Zone A and Zone B respectively.

Nationwide League

The Nationwide League was played in 2 zones. Zonal winners were A.F.C. Leopards and Sofapaka, who gained promotion for the following season.

Zone A

Zone B 

Coast Stars from Mombasa were relegated from the Premier League in 2007, but refused to join the Nationwide League. They were replaced by Malindi United. Shalimar of Naivasha were to compete in Zone A and had already played some games before pulling out of the league. They were replaced by Kisumu Black Stars which joined when the league was halfway done.

KFF Cup

The President's Cup was renamed to the KFF Cup. The tournament was won by Gor Mahia, who beat Provincial League side Posta Rangers in the final. Apart from Gor Mahia, all other Premier League teams skipped the tournament due to high costs.

National team

World Cup qualifiers – CAF Second Round (Group 2)
The national team played in the 2010 World Cup qualifiers and reached the 3rd qualifying round. The qualifiers also doubled as the 2010 African Cup of Nations qualifiers.

2008 CECAFA Cup

Kenya took part in the 2008 CECAFA Cup, which continued into 2009 due to postponements. They reached the final but were beaten 1-0 by Uganda. Shortly after the end of the tournament, Francis Kimanzi was sacked as the head coach due to disagreements with the Kenya Football Federation.

Group stage

Other matches
There were no other matches played by Kenya in 2008.

References

External links 
RSSSF: Kenya 2008
Kenyan Premier League
Kenyan Footie - Kenyan Football Portal
FIFA World Cup 2010 - Africa qualifiers
Kenyafootball